La Resistencia is a 1972 Argentine film.

Cast
 Néstor Ducó
 Pascual Pelliciota
 Juan Carlos Puppo
 Rubén Santagada
 Humberto Serrano
 Juan Carlos Torres
 Oscar Veronese

External links
 

1972 films
Argentine short films
1970s Spanish-language films
1970s Argentine films
1972 short films